Terminator: The Sarah Connor Chronicles is a science fiction drama series developed for the Fox Broadcasting Company by Josh Friedman. The series follows the characters of Sarah and John Connor (portrayed by Lena Headey and Thomas Dekker, respectively) after the events of Terminator 2: Judgment Day.  In the pilot, the pair are transported from 1999 to 2007 by a terminator named Cameron Phillips (Summer Glau) who was sent back from 2027 to protect John.  From that point, the show chronicles the trio's attempt to stop the computer system Skynet from going online, triggering a nuclear holocaust and declaring war on mankind in an apocalyptic future.

The Sarah Connor Chronicles premiered on Sunday, January 13, 2008 after the New York Giants and Dallas Cowboys playoff game at 9:00PM Eastern/8:00PM Central to the highest ratings for a scripted television program on Fox in seven years and the most viewers for a scripted show on the network in eight years.  Additionally, it also had the highest ratings of a scripted program debut during prime time among adults 18–34 and 18–49 (key demographics for advertisers) in three years and the most viewers for a scripted program premiere in two years.  A second episode followed the next day, Monday, in the show's regular timeslot at 9:00PM Eastern/8:00PM Central.

Due to the 2007-2008 Writers Guild of America strike, only nine of the original thirteen episodes for the first season were completed.

The producers of the show announced that it was renewed for a second season, initially for only 13 episodes. The new season began airing on September 8, 2008 in the United States. On October 17, 2008 the network gave the show a full second season order, bringing the total number of season 2 episodes to 22. The series went on a brief hiatus mid-season, from December 16, 2008, to February 13, 2009. When it returned, it was scheduled with Joss Whedon's Dollhouse on Friday nights.

A total of 31 episodes of Terminator: The Sarah Connor Chronicles aired before the series was cancelled on May 18, 2009.

Series overview

Episodes

Season 1 (2008)

Season 2 (2008–09)

Notes

References

External links

Lists of American science fiction television series episodes